Darya Vladimirovna Volga (Ukrainian: Дар’я Володимирівна Волга, also known as Dasha Volga) (born June 19, 1974, Kyiv) is a Ukrainian TV and Film personality. She was the original host for Russia's Let's Get Married on Channel One. Since the annexation of Crimea in 2014 moved her projects to Ukraine.

Career
In New Zealand, Volga starred in the television series appeared on the television show Rude Awakenings, and was the star in Beyond the Ocean, as well as several commercials.

In Russia, Volga first appeared as a weather forecaster on TNT. Volga gained popularity by filming on the series St. Petersburg Secrets, Maroseyka, 12, Tatiana's Day and the French film Lisa Alisa (The Fox Alisa).

From July 28 to October 3, 2008, she was the head presenter of Let's Get Married.

Selected filmography
 1994 — St. Petersburg Secrets as Masha Chechevinskaya
1995 —  What a Wonderful Game as Yulya
 2007 — Tatiana's Day as  Galina Rybkina (TV series)
2010 — Yefrosinya as Tatiana (TV series)
 2013 — Zemsky Doctor as  Liza Martynova (TV series)
 2019 - ´Water’ -writer and director ( short film, Ukraine)
 2022- ‘Suri’- writer and director ( short film, Ukraine)
 2022- ´Pokut’ as Vika ( feature film, Ukraine)

Personal life
In 1995, Volga graduated from the VGIK. In 2001 she moved with her husband  to New Zealand. In 2003, Volga graduated from the Directing Department of the University of Auckland and holds a Master of Arts.

References

External links
 
 Darya Volga at the kino-teatr.ru

1974 births
Living people
Television presenters from Kyiv
Russian film actresses
Russian television actresses
20th-century Russian actresses
21st-century Russian actresses
Honored Artists of the Russian Federation
Russian television presenters
Gerasimov Institute of Cinematography alumni
Russian women television presenters
University of Auckland alumni